Videna electra is a species of terrestrial pulmonate gastropod mollusk in the family Trochomorphidae.

This species is endemic to Palau.

References
1. Rundell, R. J. Cryptic diversity, molecular phylogeny and biogeography of the rock- and leaf litter-dwelling land snails of Belau (Republic of Palau, Oceania). Philos. Trans. R. Soc. B Biol. Sci. 363, 3401–3412 (2008).

Fauna of Palau
Videna
Endemic fauna of Palau
Taxonomy articles created by Polbot